Pamvo Berynda ( 1560 in Yezupil – July 13, 1632, in Kyiv) was a Ukrainian lexicographer, linguist, and Orthodox monk, best remembered for authoring The Slovene – Russian Lexicon.

References 

1560 births
1632 deaths
Ukrainian lexicographers